The Long Range Discrimination Radar (LRDR) that is planned for operational service in Alaska in 2020 is part of the United States's Ground-Based Midcourse Defense anti-ballistic missile system. The main contractor is Lockheed Martin, under a US$784 million contract from the Missile Defense Agency in October 2015.

LRDR is a gallium nitride (GaN)-based, solid-state Active Electronically Scanned Array (AESA) early-warning radar that allows for continuous coverage, even when it is undergoing maintenance. The radar consists of individual solid state radar blocks that can be combined to scale up the size of the radar. The multi-purpose GaN device used on the prototype version of the LRDR is from the Japanese electronics company Fujitsu, according to Lockheed Martin.

Construction in Alaska for the LRDR was scheduled to begin in 2019, tentatively at Clear Space Force Station in central Alaska.

In late February 2021, the Missile Defense Agency said that the radar installation was underway, with Initial Operational Capability to be achieved in 2021.

AN/SPY-7(V)1
The AN/SPY-7(V)1 is the official designation of an LRDR-derivative used with the Aegis Ballistic Missile Defense System. On 30 July 2018, the Japanese government approved a plan to purchase two pairs of AN/SPY-7(V)1 for the Aegis Ashore facility and will be installed in Yamaguchi Prefecture and Akita Prefecture. The first operation is expected to start from 2025, by Japan Ground Self Defense Force.

Missile Defense Agency has also decided to use AN/SPY-7(V)1 for the Aegis Ashore to be installed in Hawaii. Derivatives of the AN/SPY-7(V)1 will be used on the Canadian Surface Combatant and the Spanish F-110 frigate.

In September 2020, AN/SPY-7(V)1 was chosen by Canada as the primary radar for its future Canadian Surface Combatant (CSC) along with CMS-330 Combat Management System with Aegis Combat System.

Lockheed Martin promoted this version of radar as the AN/SPY-1 refurbishment program to the US Navy to extend the lifespan of the Ticonderoga-class cruiser and Arleigh Burke-class destroyer to beyond the 2040s. In December 2021, the AN/SPY-6 AESA radar from Raytheon was selected to retrofit Flight IIA Arleigh Burke destroyers; the same radar is used on Flight III ships.

References

External links
 Lockheed Martin - LRDR

Radar
Early warning systems
Radar networks
United States Space Surveillance Network
Missile defense
Equipment of the United States Space Force